Pocataligo is an unincorporated community in Madison County, in the U.S. state of Georgia.

History
Variant names are "Pocatalago", "Pocateligo" and "Pocotalago". A post office called Pocataligo was established in 1900, and remained in operation until 1903.

The Georgia General Assembly incorporated Pocataligo as a town in 1920. The town's municipal charter was repealed in 1995.

References

Former municipalities in Georgia (U.S. state)
Unincorporated communities in Madison County, Georgia
Unincorporated communities in Georgia (U.S. state)
Populated places disestablished in 1995